The 2021 Women's FIBA Olympic Qualifying Tournament was initially scheduled to be held in Bangalore, India from 18 to 22 March 2020. However, due to the COVID-19 pandemic, the tournament was moved to Graz, Austria and was held from 26 to 30 May 2021. The games were accommodated a temporary makeshift 2,000-seat capacity at the Hauptplatz.

Qualified teams
Teams already qualified for the Olympics were excluded. The hosts of the OQT, the top three teams from the World Cup, and 16 teams from the rankings (including Japan, if not already qualified) competed for three Olympic qualifying places.

Players

Preliminary round

Pool A

Pool B

Pool C

Pool D

Knockout stage
No final was played. The winners of the semifinals and the third place game winner qualified for the Olympics.

Final standings

References

See also
2021 FIBA 3x3 Olympic Qualifying Tournament

External links
Official website

Qualification for the 2020 Summer Olympics
Women's 3x3
2020 Summer Olympics – Women's 3x3 qualification
Impact of the COVID-19 pandemic on the 2020 Summer Olympics
2020 Women's 3x3
FIBA